Saltbox is the fourth full-length album by the Red Aunts.  It was released in 1996 on Epitaph.

Track listing
"Whatever" – 1:37
"I Can't Do Anything Right" – 0:52
"Paco" – 1:25
"All Red Inside" – 1:31
"Suerte" – 1:25
"Eldritch Sauce" – 2:27
"Fake Modern" – 1:42
"Handsome Devil" – 1:51
"The Snake" – 2:07
"Ruby (What I Won't)" – 1:25
"$5" – 1:05
"Palm Tree Swing" – 2:18
"Bullet Train" – 1:16
"Goin' Downtown" – 2:43

References

Red Aunts albums
1996 albums